Beka III Jaqeli, also known as Sefer Pasha, (c. 1564—1635) was a Georgian ruler of Childir Eyalet and vassal of the Ottoman Empire from 1625 to 1635. He was a member of the Jaqeli family and the third son of Kaikhosro II Jaqeli and Dedisimedi. Beka came to power after poisoning his nephew Manuchar III, the last Christian ruler of Samtskhe-Saatabago. After this Beka III went to Istanbul, on the court of Sultan Murad IV. He converted to Islam, called himself Sefer Pasha and returned to his ruling state. Under his rule Ottomans started the process of spreading Islam in Samtskhe. Sefer Pasha Died in 1635 and was succeeded by his son, Yusuf I as a new Pasha of Childir.

References

Sources
 
 

1560s births
1635 deaths
16th-century people from Georgia (country)
17th-century people from Georgia (country)
17th-century people from the Ottoman Empire
Converts to Islam from Eastern Orthodoxy
Georgians from the Ottoman Empire
House of Jaqeli
Ottoman governors of Georgia
Pashas
Pashas of Childir Eyalet